A Cry from the Streets is a 1958 British drama film directed by Lewis Gilbert. It was entered into the 1st Moscow International Film Festival, and Vernon Harris's screenplay received a BAFTA nomination.

Plot
When a man is hanged for murdering his wife, their three small children go into social care. Bill (Max Bygraves) is an electrician with the local care home, and is introduced to the children and their social worker, Ann (Barbara Murray). Growing ever fonder of the kids, he and Ann take them out on trips and picnics, to try and bring some happiness back into their lives. However, events spiral out of control when a child gets hold of a loaded gun.

Cast
 Max Bygraves as Bill Lowther 
 Barbara Murray as Ann Fairlie 
 Colin Petersen as Georgie 
 Dana Wilson as Barbie 
 Kathleen Harrison as Mrs. Farrer 
 Sean Barrett as Don Farrer 
 Mona Washbourne as Mrs. Daniels 
 Eleanor Summerfield as Gloria 
 Toke Townley as Mr. Daniels 
 Avice Landone as Rachel Seymour
 Fred Griffiths as Mr. Hodges
 John Moulder Brown as Jacky (uncredited)

Reception

Box Office
Kinematograph Weekly listed it as being "in the money" at the British box office in 1958. It was one of the twelve most popular films of the year.

Critical
The New York Times wrote "this inquiry into the lives of some of the orphaned and homeless youngsters in a municipal children's shelter is realistic, bittersweet drama played with compassion and insight. Although it sometimes waxes melodramatic, it gently tugs at the heartstrings and, now and again, tickles the funnybone only as guileless kids can."

References

External links

 

 A Cry from the Streets review at The New York Times

1958 films
1958 drama films
British drama films
1950s English-language films
Films directed by Lewis Gilbert
Films produced by Ian Dalrymple
1950s British films